Agelasta ocellifera is a species of beetle in the family Cerambycidae. It was described by John O. Westwood in 1863, originally under the genus Lamia. It is known from the Philippines.

References

ocellifera
Beetles described in 1863